John Patrick Mooney (born March 20, 1998) is an American professional basketball player for Chiba Jets Funabashi of the Japanese B.League. He played college basketball at the University of Notre Dame.

Early life and high school career
Mooney is the son of Margaret and Kevin Mooney, a builder/contractor for an appliance company who played Division II golf at Spring Hill College. He has two older siblings, Brendan and Caitlin. Mooney began playing for Nike Team Florida in AAU play alongside Florida coach Billy Donovan's son Bryan in eighth grade. Mooney attended Lake Brantley High School. As a senior, he averaged 24.8 points, 14 rebounds and five blocks per game and was named to the first-team all-state.

He initially committed to play under Donovan at Florida but reopened his recruitment after Donovan took the coaching job of the Oklahoma City Thunder. After fielding offers from Indiana, Kansas, Georgia Tech, Georgia, Wake Forest, Alabama, Florida State, Vanderbilt, and Stanford, Mooney's father asked Donovan his opinion on Notre Dame. Donovan telephoned Notre Dame coach Mike Brey and informed him about Mooney, and Brey sent his brother to scout the prospect. Mooney committed to the Fighting Irish after taking his official visit.

College career
As a freshman, Mooney served as a backup to Bonzie Colson. Mooney averaged  5.6 points, 3.9 rebounds and 0.5 assists per game in his sophomore season. As a junior, Mooney was named to the Third Team All-ACC and finished second to Jordan Nwora as the league most improved player. He averaged 14.1 points and 11.2 rebounds per game, though the Fighting Irish finished 14–19 and were last in the ACC. Mooney registered 15 double-doubles in ACC play, including eight straight from January 2 to February 5, 2019. 

Coming into his senior season, Mooney was named to the Preseason All-ACC team and received three votes for Preseason Player of the Year. After scoring 28 points and grabbing 16 rebounds in a win against Howard, Mooney was named ACC player of the week on November 18, 2019. On January 4, 2020, Mooney tied his career-high with 28 points and had 14 rebounds in an 88–87 win versus Syracuse. As a result, Mooney earned his second ACC player of the week honors on January 6. He had his 12th consecutive double-double with 21 points and 13 rebounds in a loss to Syracuse on January 22, breaking Luke Harangody's school record of consecutive double-doubles. At the conclusion of the regular season, Mooney was selected to the First Team All-ACC. He averaged 16.2 points and 12.7 rebounds per game as a senior.

Professional career

Perth Wildcats (2020–2021) 
On August 14, 2020, Mooney signed a one-year deal with the Perth Wildcats of the Australian National Basketball League (NBL). In the Wildcats' season opener on January 24, 2021, he recorded 13 points and 14 rebounds in an 88–76 win over the South East Melbourne Phoenix. He set a record for rebounds by a Wildcat playing in his first NBL game. For the season, he averaged a double-double, becoming the first Wildcat to do that since 2007, and finished the season with 27 double-doubles in 42 games – the second most in a season by a Wildcat. His 11.4 rebounds per game is the eighth highest in club history and his total of 480 rebounds is the third-most in a single season in NBL history. He helped the Wildcats reach the 2021 NBL Grand Final series, where they lost 3–0 to Melbourne United. He was subsequently named the Wildcats Club MVP.

Chiba Jets (2021–present) 
On July 15, 2021, Mooney signed with Chiba Jets Funabashi of the Japanese B.League. He re-signed with Chiba on May 27, 2022.

Career statistics

College

|-
| style="text-align:left;"| 2016–17
| style="text-align:left;"| Notre Dame
| 12 || 0 || 3.8 || .625 || .500 || 1.000 || 1.6 || .2 || .1 || .1 || 1.2
|-
| style="text-align:left;"| 2017–18
| style="text-align:left;"| Notre Dame
| 36 || 7 || 15.4 || .480 || .419 || .531 || 3.9 || .5 || .3 || .4 || 5.6
|-
| style="text-align:left;"| 2018–19
| style="text-align:left;"| Notre Dame
| 33 || 33 || 29.6 || .455 || .374 || .769 || 11.2 || 1.3 || .9 || .8 || 14.1
|-
| style="text-align:left;"| 2019–20
| style="text-align:left;"| Notre Dame
| 31 || 31 || 32.7 || .460 || .295 || .635 || 12.7 || 1.7 || 1.3 || .7 || 16.2
|- class="sortbottom"
| style="text-align:center;" colspan="2"| Career
| 112 || 71 || 23.1 || .462 || .358 || .675 || 8.2 || 1.0 || .7 || .6 || 10.5

References

External links

Notre Dame Fighting Irish bio

1998 births
Living people
American expatriate basketball people in Australia
American men's basketball players
Basketball players from Baltimore
Lake Brantley High School alumni
Notre Dame Fighting Irish men's basketball players
Perth Wildcats players
Power forwards (basketball)